This is a list of airlines operating in The Maldives.

Scheduled airlines

See also
 List of airlines
 List of defunct airlines of Maldives
 List of defunct airlines of Asia

Maldives
Airlines
Airlines
Maldives